Makawan Kerdanan (born July 14, 1997) is a Thai professional footballer who plays as a defensive midfielder for the Thai League 2 club Udon Thani.

References

External links
http://player.7mth.com/1463299/index.shtml
https://mgronline.com/sport/detail/9620000124213
https://www.siamsport.co.th/football/thaileague2/view/107258

1999 births
Living people
Makawan Kerdanan
Makawan Kerdanan
Association football midfielders
Makawan Kerdanan
Makawan Kerdanan
Makawan Kerdanan
Makawan Kerdanan
Makawan Kerdanan
Makawan Kerdanan
Thai expatriate sportspeople in Portugal
Thai expatriate sportspeople in Germany
Makawan Kerdanan
Nakhon Si United F.C. players